Nağaraxana (formerly Kirovka) is a village and municipality in the Shamakhi Rayon of Azerbaijan. It has a population of 759.

References

Populated places in Shamakhi District